Edward Plantagenet may refer to:

Edward I of England (1239–1307), popularly known as Longshanks, reigned from 1272 until his death
Edward II of England (1284–1327), reigned from 1307 until he was deposed in January 1327, and was murdered in September
Edward III of England (1312–1377), crowned at the age of 14, and one of the more successful English monarchs of the Middle Ages
Edward IV of England (1442–1483), reigned from 1461 to 1470, and again from 1471
Edward V of England (1470–1483), king for two months in 1483 until deposed and sent to the Tower
Edward of Middleham, Prince of Wales (1473–1484), only son of King Richard III of England
Edward of Norwich, 2nd Duke of York (c. 1373–1415), grandson of Edward III
Edward of Westminster, Prince of Wales (1453–1471), son of King Henry VI
Edward, the Black Prince (1330–1376), son of Edward III, known during his lifetime as Edward of Woodstock
Edward Plantagenet, 17th Earl of Warwick (1475–1499), son of George Plantagenet, 1st Duke of Clarence, himself son of Richard Plantagenet, 3rd Duke of York